Fundong (Kom: Fɨ̀ndoŋ) is a town and commune in Cameroon. It is the capital of Boyo Division, with a population of about 20,000. It is situated about 80 km from Bamenda, the regional Headquarters of the North West region. The population of Fundong is mostly rural with farming as primary occupation.

Fundong is mainly populated by Kom people.

See also
Communes of Cameroon

References
 Site de la primature - Élections municipales 2002 
 Contrôle de gestion et performance des services publics communaux des villes camerounaises - Thèse de Donation Avele, Université Montesquieu Bordeaux IV 
 Charles Nanga, La réforme de l’administration territoriale au Cameroun à la lumière de la loi constitutionnelle n° 96/06 du 18 janvier 1996, Mémoire ENA. 

Communes of Northwest Region (Cameroon)